Gelenau is a municipality in the district of Erzgebirgskreis, in Saxony, Germany.

References

Sources

External links 
 
 

Erzgebirgskreis